The Journal on African Philosophy is an electronic journal sponsored by the International Society for African Philosophy and Studies and published by Africa Resource Center.

External links 
 Journal website
 Electronic Journals Library (EZB)

African studies journals
Publications established in 2002
Philosophy journals
African philosophy